The 1998 Penn Quakers football team was an American football team that represented the University of Pennsylvania during the 1998 NCAA Division I-AA football season. A year after having to forfeit all of its Ivy League wins, Penn won the conference championship in 1998.

In their seventh year under head coach Al Bagnoli, the Quakers compiled an 8–2 record and outscored opponents 297 to 212. Jim Finn and Joe Piela were the team captains.

Penn's 6–1 conference record topped the Ivy League standings. The Quakers outscored Ivy opponents 225 to 137 by Ivy opponents. 

Penn played its home games at Franklin Field adjacent to the university's campus in Philadelphia, Pennsylvania.

Schedule

References

Penn
Penn Quakers football seasons
Ivy League football champion seasons
Penn Quakers football